Vänersborg Municipality (Vänersborgs kommun) is a municipality in Västra Götaland County in western Sweden.  Its seat is located in the city of Vänersborg.

The present municipality was created during the local government reform in the early 1970s. In 1971 the City of Vänersborg became a municipality of unitary type and three years later it was amalgamated with three surrounding municipalities. The number of original local government entities (as of 1863) is eight.

Localities
Brålanda, 1,500 inhabitants
Frändefors, 600
Katrinedal, 300
Nordkroken, 400
Vargön, 5,000
Vänersborg (seat), 22,000

International relations

Twin towns — Sister cities
The following cities are twinned with Vänersborg:
  Arsuk, Sermersooq, Greenland
  Åland, Finland
  Eiði, Eysturoy, Faroe Islands
  Herning, Midtjylland, Denmark
  Lich, Hesse, Germany
  Husby, Schleswig-Holstein, Germany
  Kangasala, Western Finland, Finland
  Siglufjörður, Eyjafjörður, Iceland
  Holmestrand, Vestfold, Norway
  Räpina, Põlva County, Estonia

References
Article on Swedish Wikipedia
Article Vänersborg - From Nordisk familjebok

External links

Vänersborg Municipality - Official site
The local newspaper (TTELA)

 
Municipalities of Västra Götaland County
North Älvsborg